Gou Junchen (born 20 March 1990) is a Chinese footballer currently playing as a defender for Chengdu Rongcheng.

Club career
Gou Junchen would play for the Beijing Guoan youth team before joining third tier club Hebei Zhongji. At Jiangxi he would go on to establish himself as a member of the team that went on to win the division title and promotion at the end of the 2014 China League Two campaign. He would go on to join third tier club Suzhou Dongwu and would go on to establish himself as a vital member of the team that gained promotion at the end of the 2019 China League Two campaign. 

On 12 April 2021, Gou Junchen joined second tier football club Chengdu Rongcheng. He would make his debut and score his first goal for the club on 26 April 2021 in a league game against Jiangxi Beidamen, which ended in a 4-2 victory. At the end of the season he would establish himself as a regular within the team and aid them to promotion at the end of the 2021 league campaign.

Career statistics
.

Honours

Club
Jiangxi Liansheng
 China League Two: 2014

References

External links

1990 births
Living people
Chinese footballers
Association football defenders
China League One players
China League Two players
Suzhou Dongwu F.C. players
Chengdu Rongcheng F.C. players